Torikeskus (Finnish for "Marketplace centre") can refer to:
 Torikeskus (Jyväskylä shopping centre), a shopping centre in Jyväskylä, Finland
 Torikeskus (Seinäjoki shopping centre), a shopping centre in Seinäjoki, Finland